38th Street/Washington (also known as GateWay Community College) is a light rail station on Valley Metro Rail in Phoenix, Arizona, United States. It is the twelfth stop westbound and the seventeenth stop eastbound on the initial  starter line. This station is a park and ride station.

Ridership

Notable places nearby
 GateWay Community College
 Delaware North Phoenix Park 'n Swap
 Phoenix Rising Soccer Stadium

References

External links
 Valley Metro map

Valley Metro Rail stations in Phoenix, Arizona
Railway stations in the United States opened in 2008
2008 establishments in Arizona